Scars of Jealousy is a 1923 American silent drama film directed by Lambert Hillyer and starring Lloyd Hughes and Frank Keenan. It was produced by Thomas H. Ince and distributed through Associated First National, later First National.

Cast
Frank Keenan as Colonel Newland
Edmund Burns as Jeff Newland
Lloyd Hughes as Cody Jacques
Marguerite De La Motte as Helen Meanix
James Neill as Colonel Meanix
Walter Lynch as Pere Jakes
James "Jim" Mason as Zeke Jakes
Mattie Peters as Mandy
George H. Reed as Mose (credited as George Reed)

Preservation status
Prints of Scars of Jealousy survive at the Cinémathèque royale de Belgique, UCLA Film and Television Archive, and George Eastman Museum.

References

External links

Lantern slide
Window card (archived)

1923 films
American silent feature films
Films directed by Lambert Hillyer
American black-and-white films
Silent American drama films
1923 drama films
1920s American films
1920s English-language films